George Hillyard and Ernest Lewis defeated Arthur Gore and George Mewburn 6–2, 6–1, 6–3 in the All Comers' Final, but the reigning champions Ernest Renshaw and William Renshaw defeated Hillyard and Lewis 6–4, 6–4, 3–6, 0–6, 6–1 in the challenge round to win the gentlemen's doubles tennis title at the 1889 Wimbledon Championships.

Draw

Challenge round

All Comers'

References

External links

Gentlemen's Doubles
Wimbledon Championship by year – Men's doubles